Roujiamo or rougamo is a street food originating from the cuisine of Shaanxi Province and widely consumed all over China. In the United States, it is sometimes called a Chinese hamburger.

Overview
The meat is most commonly pork, stewed for hours in a soup containing over 20 spices and seasonings. Although it is possible to use only a few spices (which many vendors do), the resulting meat is less flavourful.

Some alternatives are also available. For example, in Muslim areas in Xi'an, the meat is usually beef (seasoned with cumin and pepper), and in Gansu Province it is often lamb. The meat is then minced or chopped and stuffed in "baijimo", a type of flatbread. An authentic baijimo is made from a wheat flour dough with yeast and then baked in a clay oven, but now in many parts of China, baijimo is made in a frying pan, giving a taste that diverges significantly from the clay oven-baked version. Depending on the types of spices used to cook the meat and the way the bread is made, the taste of roujiamo can vary greatly from vendor to vendor. Roujiamo is not a full meal and is often sold in the form of combo with liangpi.

Roujiamo is considered the Chinese equivalent to the Western hamburger and meat sandwiches. Roujiamo is considered to be one of the world's oldest types of hamburgers, since the bread or the "mo" dates back to the Qin dynasty (221–206 BC) and the meat to the Zhou dynasty (1045–256 BC). However, since people have been stuffing meat inside bread all across the world for centuries, it is unknown where it was done first.

See also

 Ice Peak (soft drink)
 Doner kebab
 Donkey burger
 Gua bao, a Chinese pork belly bun
 List of pork dishes
 List of sandwiches
 Sloppy joe

References

Further reading

 

Shaanxi cuisine
Meat dishes
Pork sandwiches
Street food in China